The Forte dos Reis Magos or Fortaleza dos Reis Magos (Fortress of the Three Wise Men) is a fortress located in the city of Natal in the Brazilian state of Rio Grande do Norte.

The fortress was the first milestone of the city – founded on 25 December 1599 – on the right side of the bar of the Potengi River (today near the Newton Navarro bridge). It received its name based on the date of commencement of its construction, 6 January 1598, at Epiphany Catholic calendar.

References

External links
 Forte dos Reis Magos in: Fortalezas.org

Buildings and structures in Rio Grande do Norte
Reis Magos
Natal, Rio Grande do Norte
Portuguese colonial architecture in Brazil
National heritage sites of Rio Grande do Norte